Florjan Lipuš (born 4 May 1937 in Lobnig above Bad Eisenkappel, Austria) is a Carinthian Slovene writer and translator. Since 1985 he has been a corresponding member of the Slovenian Academy of Sciences and Arts.

Awards
 2004: Prešeren Award 
 2011: Petrarca-Preis
 2013: Franz Nabl Prize
 2018: Grand Austrian State Prize
 2022: Honorary Doctor, University of Klagenfurt
 2022: Grand Decoration of Honour in Gold, state of Carinthia

References 

1937 births
Slovenian writers
Slovenian translators
Prešeren Award laureates
Carinthian Slovenes
Living people
Members of the Slovenian Academy of Sciences and Arts